Lee Melchionni (born September 30, 1983) is an American sports agent and former professional basketball player. Melchionni played college basketball for the Duke Blue Devils in the NCAA.

High school career
Melchionni was a high honorable mention All-American in the 2001–02 season and a high honorable mention McDonald's All-America. He was a two-time all-state selection (2001–2002), three-time all-county selection, and two-time all-city selection. He was the MVP of the 2002 Prime Time Shootout. During his senior year at Germantown Academy in Fort Washington, Pennsylvania, he averaged 19.7 points, 9.2 rebounds, 5.0 assists, and 3.0 steals. Melchionni finished with over 1200 points and 800 rebounds. He also averaged 16 points, a team-best 9.0 rebounds, 4.0 assists, and 4.0 steals as a junior. He helped lead Germantown to a 27–3 record and a number 17 national ranking by USA Today in 2000–01. He averaged 12.0 points, 6.0 rebounds, and 2.0 assists as a sophomore and averaged 10.0 points, 5.0 rebounds, and 2.0 assists as a freshman.

College career
Melchionni played with the Duke Blue Devils from 2002 to 2006 and was number 13. Melchionni played primarily at the forward position.

Professional career

Cimberio Novara (2006–2007) 
Melchionni spent a single season playing professionally in Italy for Cimberio Novara in the Italian 2nd division. Melchionni is now working as an NBA Player Agent for Wasserman Media Group, representing players like Danilo Gallinari. Melchionni was also enrolled in evening law school at Loyola Law School.

Personal life
Melchionni was born in Lancaster, Pennsylvania. His father, Gary Melchionni, also played basketball at Duke and was team captain. Gary was also an All-ACC performer and was drafted by the Phoenix Suns in the 2nd Round of the 1973 NBA draft.  Lee's uncle, Bill Melchionni, played college basketball with Villanova while in college and played with the Philadelphia 76ers and New Jersey Nets while playing in the NBA. Lee's younger brother, Dean Melchionni, played college basketball for the Texas Longhorns.

References

External links
CBS Sportsline player page
Player page at GoDuke.com

1983 births
Living people
American expatriate basketball people in Italy
Basketball players from Pennsylvania
Duke Blue Devils men's basketball players
Sportspeople from Lancaster, Pennsylvania
Germantown Academy alumni
American men's basketball players
Forwards (basketball)